Ochsner Medical Center – West Bank is a hospital in Gretna, Louisiana, USA.

The 107-bed hospital opened in 1984 as Meadowcrest Hospital and was run by Tenet Healthcare. Following Ochsner Health System's acquisition in 2006, the hospital changed to its current name.

References

Hospital buildings completed in 1984
Hospitals in Louisiana
Buildings and structures in Jefferson Parish, Louisiana
Hospitals established in 1984